Out West may refer to:

Out West (magazine), published in Los Angeles between 1894 and 1935
Out West (1918 film), American comedy two-reeler starring Fatty Arbuckle and Buster Keaton
Out West  (1947 film), American comedy two-reeler starring The Three Stooges
Out West (album), 2005 double-album by English indie rock band Gomez
"Out West" (song), 2020 American single by Travis Scott and Young Thug

See also
Way Out West (disambiguation)
Out of the West, 1926 American Western film